Sáránd is a village in Eastern Hungary, in Hajdú-Bihar county, with a small Romanian population. Olympian József Gyönyörű was born here.

References

External links
Homepage of the Village of Sáránd (in Hungarian)

Populated places in Hajdú-Bihar County